Sondes Hachana (born 7 September 1996) is a Tunisian handball player for ASF Teboulba and the Tunisian national team.

She represented Tunisia at the 2013 World Women's Handball Championship in Serbia.

References

Tunisian female handball players
1996 births
Living people
Mediterranean Games competitors for Tunisia
Competitors at the 2022 Mediterranean Games